The Superliga Nacional de Futebol Americano (National American Football League, previously Liga Brasileira de Futebol Americano, Brazilian American Football League) is an American football league in Brazil. It was created by eight teams which played the Torneio Touchdown.

It follows the structure of the NFL Season - with Conferences, Wildcards and a single-game final, called Brasil Bowl. Cuiabá Arsenal is the first champion of Brasil Bowl.

Its current winner is João Pessoa Espectros.

Teams

2014

Champions
Liga Brasileira de Futebol Americano

Campeonato Brasileiro de Futebol Americano

Brazil Bowl

See also
American Football Brazilian Confederation
Brazil national American football team
Torneio Touchdown

References

External links
Liga Nacional de Futebol Americano
Official website of the Brazilian American Football Association

American football in Brazil
American football leagues
Sports leagues established in 2010
2010 establishments in Brazil
Professional sports leagues in Brazil